The 453rd Bombardment Group is an inactive United States Air Force unit that was first organized in June 1943, during World War II, as a Consolidated B-24 Liberator heavy bomber group.  After training in the United States, it deployed to England in December 1943, and, starting in February 1944, participated in the strategic bombing campaign against Germany with Eighth Air Force. Its 733d Bombardment Squadron completed 82 consecutive missions without a loss, a record for Eighth Air Force bomber units. James Stewart, of film fame, was group operations officer from 31 March to 1 July 1944.  The group was programmed for redeployment to the Pacific and returned to the United States in May 1945 for training, however the Japanese surrender cancelled these plans and the group was inactivated in September 1945.

The group was redesignated the 453rd Operations Group and activated at Fairchild Air Force Base in June 1992 to command Air Mobility Command (AMC)'s air refueling units at Fairchild Air Force Base, Washington.  It was inactivated in July 1994, when the 92nd Bomb Wing at Fairchild became an air refueling unit and transferred from Air Combat Command to AMC.

It was converted to provisional status as the 453d Expeditionary Air Refueling Group in 2002.

History

World War II

Training in the United States
The 453rd Bombardment Group was activated at Wendover Field, Utah on 1 June 1943 with the 732nd, 733rd, 734th and 735th Bombardment Squadrons assigned as its original elements.  It then moved to Pocatello Army Air Field, Idaho, where it was brought up to strength and trained with Consolidated B-24 Liberators. The group completed its training at March Field, California, in December before departing for the European Theater of Operations, with the ground echelon embarking on 2 December.

Combat in Europe
The ground echelon arrived at the group's combat station, RAF Old Buckenham, on 23 December 1943. By January 1944, it was fully established at Old Buckenham with the arrival of the air echelon.  The 453rd flew its first mission against an airfield at Tours on 4 February 1944.  It then participated primarily in the strategic bombing campaign against Germany.  Toward the end of February, the squadron took part in Big Week, the concentrated attack on the German aircraft manufacturing industry. Other targets in Germany included a rail viaduct at Altenbeken, a fuel storage facility at Dulmen, oil refineries at Gelsenkirchen, an ordnance depot at Glinde, an aircraft assembly plant at Gotha, a rail center at Hamm, a chemical factory at Leverkusen, a commercial canal at Minden, an airfield at Neumunster and marshalling yards at Paderborn.

The group also engaged in air support and air interdiction missions. It bombed V-1 flying bomb and V-2 rocket launch sites, airfields and coastal defense guns to prepare for Operation Overlord, the invasion of Normandy.  On D-Day, it struck coastal fortifications between Le Havre and Cherbourg Naval Base and enemy positions inland from the landing area.  It made attacks on enemy troops to support Operation Cobra, the breakout at Saint Lo in July 1944.  It bombed German lines of communication during the Battle of the Bulge in December 1944 and January 1945.

On two occasions, the squadron carried out airlift missions.  In September 1944, it flew rations, gasoline and blankets to advancing troops in France.  During Operation Varsity, the airborne assault across the Rhine near Wesel, it dropped medical supplies, food and ammunition to troops at the bridgehead.  The squadron flew its last mission on 12 April 1945, and was withdrawn from combat to prepare for possible redeployment to the Pacific.

James "Jimmy" Stewart, the Hollywood movie star, was group operations officer at Old Buckenham during the spring of 1944. The actor Walter Matthau also served in the group as a radioman-gunner, rising to the rank of staff sergeant.  The group's 733rd Bombardment Squadron flew 82 consecutive missions without a loss, which was a record for Eighth Air Force bomber units.  The group flew 259 combat missions, during which it lost 58 Liberators, against the claim of 42 enemy aircraft destroyed.

Return and inactivation
The 453rd Group was withdrawn from combat operations on 12 April 1945 to prepare for possible redeployment to the Pacific Theate.  Personnel departed Old Buckenham for the port of embarkation on 9 May 1945, apparently leaving their aircraft behind.  The squadron assembled at New Castle Army Air Field, Delaware in late May, but soon moved to Fort Dix Army Air Base, New Jersey.  Initial plans to convert the unit to a very heavy bomber squadron were canceled following the Japanese surrender in August 1945, after which the unit was inactivated on 12 September.

Tanker operations
When Strategic Air Command was disestablished on 1 June 1992, its 92nd Wing at Fairchild Air Force Base, Washington was transferred to the new Air Combat Command and redesignated the 92d Bomb Wing as it lost its refueling elements.  Its 92d Air Refueling Squadron and its Boeing KC-135 Stratotankers were transferred to Air Mobility Command (AMC).  The 453rd was redesignated the 453rd Operations Group and activated the same day as the headquarters for the 92d Air Refueling Squadron, which was assigned to it, along with the 453rd Operations Support Squadron.

However, with the drawdown of the manned bomber force, it was decided that Fairchild would become an AMC tanker base.  In anticipation of the increase of the refueling mission at Fairchild, the 97th Air Refueling Squadron moved to Fairchild from Malmstrom Air Force Base, Montana on 1 April 1994, and the 96th and 98th Air Refueling Squadrons were activated and assigned to the group the same day.  The transition was completed on 1 July 1994, when the 92nd Wing became the 92nd Air Refueling Wing as its 325th Bomb Squadron inactivated.  The four refueling squadrons of the 453d transferred to the 92nd Operations Group and the 453d Group and its support squadron inactivated.

Expeditionary unit
In February 2001, the group was converted to provisional status as the 453rd Expeditionary Air Refueling Group and assigned to United States Air Forces in Europe to activate or inactivate as needed for contingency operations.

453rd Bomb Group Museum
In February 2015, it was announced that Old Buckenham Airport the modern civilian name for RAF Old Buckenham applied for permission to build a museum dedicated to the 453rd at their former base in England. The plans are for the erection of two Nissen huts, one of which will house an items described as having the potential to be the largest collection of 453rd Bomb Group memorabilia in existence.

Lineage
 Constituted as the 453rd Bombardment Group (Heavy) on 14 May 1943
 Activated on 1 June 1943
 Redesignated 453rd Bombardment Group, Heavy c.January 1944
 Inactivated on 12 September 1945
 Redesignated 453rd Operations Group and activated on 1 June 1992
 Inactivated 1 July 1994
 Converted to provisional status and redesignated 453d Expeditionary Air Refueling Group on 5 February 2001

Assignments
 II Bomber Command, 1 June – 2 December 1943
 20th Combat Bombardment Wing, 23 December 1943
 2d Combat Bombardment Wing, 8 January 1944 – 9 May 1945
 I Bomber Command, 18 June – 12 September 1945
 43d Air Refueling Wing, 1 June 1992 – 1 July 1994
 United States Air Forces in Europe to activate or inactivate as needed after 5 February 2001

Components
 92d Air Refueling Squadron, 1 June 1992 – 1 July 1994
 96th Air Refueling Squadron, 1 April – 1 July 1994
 97th Air Refueling Squadron, 1 April – 1 July 1994
 98th Air Refueling Squadron, 1 April – 1 July 1994
 453rd Operations Support Squadron, 1 June 1992 – 1 July 1994
 732d Bombardment Squadron, 1 June 1943 – 12 September 1945
 733d Bombardment Squadron, 1 June 1943 – 12 September 1945
 734th Bombardment Squadron, 1 June 1943 – 12 September 1945
 735th Bombardment Squadron, 1 June 1943 – 12 September 1945

Stations
 Wendover Field, Utah, 1 June 1943
 Pocatello Army Air Field, Idaho, 29 July 1943
 March Field, California, 30 September-2 December 1943
 RAF Old Buckenham (AAF-114), England, 23 December 1943 – 9 May 1945 144
 New Castle Army Air Field, Delaware, 25 May 1945
 Fort Dix Army Air Base, New Jersey, 18 June-12 September 1945
 Fairchild Air Force Base, Washington, 1 June 1992 – 1 July 1994

Aircraft
 Consolidated B-24 Liberator, 1943–1945
 Boeing KC-135 Stratotanker, 1992–1994

Campaigns

References

Notes

Bibliography

 
 
 
 
 
 

 Further reading
 
 Freeman, Roger A. (1991). The Mighty Eighth: The Colour Record. Cassell & Co. .

Operations groups of the United States Air Force